The Commonwealth Classic, also known as Commonwealth Cup or Governor's Cup (for the trophy awarded to the victor of the game), is the title of a basketball rivalry between Boston College and the University of Massachusetts. The name refers to the Commonwealth of Massachusetts, the New England state in which both universities are located. The game has been played a total of 19 times, with BC leading the series 10–9.

History

The first game between the two schools occurred December 8, 1905.  Since then, UMass and BC have played each other irregularly over the course of their in-state rivalry. In 1995, the basketball rivalry was officially designated as the "Commonwealth Classic" by then-Massachusetts Governor William Weld and members of the Massachusetts General Court who were among the nearly 20,000 spectators to watch the game at the new FleetCenter (now the TD Garden). It was the first college basketball game played in the new arena. The first game holds the record for college basketball attendance in New England. The series had been held annually since 1995, until Boston College suspended the series in 2012.

UMass dominance in the 1990s
The 1990s were the best decade of UMass Minutemen Basketball as the Minutemen went to the 1996 Final Four and went 6–0 in the decade against Boston College. Their longest winning streak ever against their cross-state rivals.

BC dominance in the 2000s
After going 0–6 against UMass in the 90's, BC has bounced back and won the first seven games in the 2000s, going 7–0. This streak was snapped on December 12, 2007 when UMass edged BC 83–80.

2010s
The 2010 game, won by Boston College, was played at the TD Garden at a part of the Boston Tip-Off Classic. After UMass routed Boston College 82–46 in 2011 in Chestnut Hill, BC ended the annual series in 2012. After a year hiatus, the rivalry was renewed in 2013 as a part of the Coaches vs. Cancer Boston Tip-Off. UMass won the 2013 game by a score 86–73 and the 2014 game by a score of 71–62.

Results

References

College basketball rivalries in the United States
Boston College Eagles men's basketball
Boston College Eagles women's basketball
UMass Minutemen basketball
UMass Minutewomen basketball
History of college basketball in the United States